Indolestes divisus, is a species of damselfly in the family Lestidae. It is endemic to Sri Lanka.

Sources 

 http://animaldiversity.org/accounts/Indolestes_divisus/classification/
 https://web.archive.org/web/20150219172210/http://www.wht.lk/storage/book_downloads/CorrigendaAddendum.pdf
 http://www.wildreach.com/reptile/animals/dragonflies.php
 http://srilankanodonata.blogspot.com/

Lestidae
Endemic fauna of Sri Lanka
Damselflies of Sri Lanka
Insects described in 1862